Aghavnavank Monastery (Armenian: Աղավնավանք, also Anapat St. Astvatsatsin, Aghnabat) is a 12th–13th century monastic complex at Dilijan National Park on the outskirts of Aghavnavank village of the Tavush Province of Armenia.

Gallery

References 
 Aghavnavank Monastery Infoboard

External links 

Armenian Apostolic monasteries in Armenia
Tourist attractions in Tavush Province
Buildings and structures in Tavush Province